Lumber is a neighbourhood in the city of Kristiansand in Agder county, Norway.  It is located in the borough of Vågsbygd and in the district of Vågsbygd. Lumber is a large industrial area.  It is north of Skyllingsheia, south of Trekanten, and east of Kjerrheia.

Transportation

References

Geography of Kristiansand
Neighbourhoods of Kristiansand